The 2003 Challenge Bell was a tennis tournament played on indoor carpet courts at the Club Avantage Multi-Sports in Quebec City in Canada that was part of Tier III of the 2003 WTA Tour. It was the 11th edition of the Challenge Bell, and was held from October 27 through November 2, 2003. Maria Sharapova won the singles title.

Champions

Singles

 Maria Sharapova def.  Milagros Sequera, 6–2, retired
It was Sharapova's 2nd title of the year and the 2nd of her career.

Doubles

 Li Ting /  Sun Tiantian def.  Els Callens /  Meilen Tu, 6–3, 6–3
It was Li's 2nd title of the year and the 2nd of her career. It was Sun's 2nd title of the year and the 2nd of her career.

External links
Official website

Challenge Bell
Tournoi de Québec
Challenge Bell
2000s in Quebec City